Erwin Arturo Frei Bolívar (18 November 1939 – January 2022) was a Chilean politician who was a senator and presidential candidate in the 1999 election.

Life and career

Arturo Frei was born in Santiago on 18 November 1939, as the son of Arturo Frei Montalva and Marcela Bolívar Le Fort. His uncle was Eduardo Frei Montalva, who would become President of Chile in 1964. Frei studied at the Colegio de los Sagrados Corazones in Concepción and Santiago. Later he studied law at the Pontifical Catholic University of Chile, graduating as a lawyer. As a student, he joined the Christian Democrat Party in 1957. Frei married María Beatriz Ruitort Barrenechea, and they have a son: Arturo Eduardo.

For a few years he was assistant professor of tax law, while also working as a lawyer for the Minister of Finance. At the same time he participated in the 1964 election that was won by his uncle. After the 1973 Chilean coup d'état, he retired from politics and dedicated himself to private practice, and also to running the Irene Frei Montalva foundation, which provided free daycare for children of poor families.

In 1969, he was elected deputy for Concepción, being reelected in 1973, with one of the highest majorities at the national level. After the return of the democracy, Frei was elected senator in 1989 and served as chairman of the Armed Forces Committee where he developed strong links with the military. After Chilean dictator Augusto Pinochet's arrest in the United Kingdom, Frei visited him in London and his independent presidential campaign to succeed his cousin Eduardo Frei Ruiz-Tagle as President was seen as a maneuver by the general to prevent Ricardo Lagos from winning the election. The Progressive Union of the Centrist Center presented Frei as their candidate for the 1999 presidential elections, where Frei fared disastrously, gaining only 0.35% of the vote, the lowest percentage of any candidate since the end of the military dictatorship.

His death was reported on 13 January 2022, at the age of 82.

See also
Frei family
Progressive Union of the Centrist Center
History of Chile

References

External links
Official presidential campaign website 

1939 births
2022 deaths
People from Santiago
Arturo Frei
Chilean people of Swiss descent
Chilean Roman Catholics
Christian Democratic Party (Chile) politicians
Union of the Centrist Center politicians
Deputies of the XLVI Legislative Period of the National Congress of Chile
Deputies of the XLVII Legislative Period of the National Congress of Chile
Senators of the XLVIII Legislative Period of the National Congress of Chile
Senators of the XLIX Legislative Period of the National Congress of Chile
Candidates for President of Chile
Pontifical Catholic University of Chile alumni